William Vilas may refer to:
 William Freeman Vilas, United States Senator from Wisconsin
 William Frederick Vilas, Canadian politician in Quebec